Steve Wang is a Taiwan-born American make-up artist and filmmaker.

Biography
Born in Taiwan, he and his parents moved to the America when he was nine.  His greatest inspirations were the tokusatsu superhero TV shows Ultraman and Kamen Rider, as well as Hong Kong kung fu films including Master of the Flying Guillotine.

As a veteran makeup artist and creature designer, Steve has worked with fellow veterans before him including Stan Winston, Rick Baker and Dick Smith.

He has received great praise for his film adaptation of the manga superhero Guyver in 1994 called Guyver: Dark Hero. Another project which drew attention to him was the direct to video movie, Drive, which starred Mark Dacascos and Kadeem Hardison. He also made independent films such as Kung Fu Rascals, based on a series of 8 mm short films he did years before. He and his brother Michael Wang, an award-winning commercials director, were hired in 2008 to work on Kamen Rider: Dragon Knight (an adaptation of Kamen Rider Ryuki), a second attempt at reviving the Kamen Rider Series in the United States, after Saban's Masked Rider of 1995. They write, produce, and direct as "The Wang Brothers".

Steve Wang designed a sculpture depicting Sarah Kerrigan (The Queen of Blades), a character from the Starcraft Universe in 2012. The sculpture was placed at the Blizzard Entertainment Office in Versailles, France the same year. He has also made statues of Tryndamere and Ryze, two champions from League of Legends, for Riot Games that same year.

Filmography

Director
Rollerblade II: Taken By Force (1989) - 2nd unit director
Kung Fu Rascals (1992)
Guyver (1991) - co-director
Guyver: Dark Hero (1994)
Drive (1997)
Sirens of The Deep (1999 - TV show/pilot)
Power Rangers Lost Galaxy (1999)
Kung Pow! Enter the Fist (2002) - 2nd unit director
Wolvy: Twisted at Birth (2003) - short film
Kamen Rider: Dragon Knight (2009)

Producer
Guyver: Dark Hero
Kung Fu Rascals
Kamen Rider: Dragon Knight
Beast Wishes

References

External links

Steve Wang on MySpace
Director's Reel on YouTube
SciFi Japan - Kamen Rider Dragon Knight
Latex Mask Central - FX Work
NERDSociety - Interview with Steve Wang

American film directors of Taiwanese descent
American people of Chinese descent
American make-up artists
Living people
Special effects people
Taiwanese emigrants to the United States
Year of birth missing (living people)